New Castle is a home rule-class city in Henry County, Kentucky, in the United States. It is the seat of its county. As of the 2010 census the population was 912.

History 
New Castle was incorporated in 1817.

Geography
New Castle is located southwest of the center of Henry County at  (38.433645, -85.169345). U.S. Route 421 follows Main Street and leads north  to Campbellsburg and southeast  to Frankfort.

Demographics

At the census of 2000, there were 919 people, 382 households, and 239 families residing in the city. The racial makeup of the city was 92.60% White, 5.77% Black or African American, 0.98% from other races, and 0.65% from two or more races. Hispanic or Latino of any race were 1.52% of the population.

There were 382 households, out of which 29.8% had children under the age of 18 living with them, 41.6% were married couples living together, 17.5% had a female householder with no husband present, and 37.2% were non-families. 33.2% of all households were made up of individuals, and 17.3% had someone living alone who was 65 years of age or older. The average household size was 2.25 and the average family size was 2.86.

In the city, the population was spread out, with 22.7% under the age of 18, 7.9% from 18 to 24, 25.2% from 25 to 44, 25.0% from 45 to 64, and 19.0% who were 65 years of age or older. The median age was 40 years. For every 100 females, there were 77.8 males. For every 100 females age 18 and over, there were 73.2 males.

The median income for a household in the city was $24,931, and the median income for a family was $34,550. Males had a median income of $27,813 versus $19,615 for females. The per capita income for the city was $12,626. About 26.8% of families and 27.3% of the population were below the poverty line, including 34.4% of those under age 18 and 20.9% of those age 65 or over.

Culture and recreation
The Samuel Hieatt House, built in 1850, was listed on the National Register of Historic Places in 1982.

References

External links
 City of New Castle official website
 KY GenWeb Henry County Kentucky History & Genealogy

Cities in Kentucky
Cities in Henry County, Kentucky
County seats in Kentucky
Louisville metropolitan area
Populated places established in 1798